Felice Centofanti (born 23 May 1969) is an Italian former footballer who played as a left-back.

Career

Football
Centofanti was born in Teramo. In his long career, he played with many teams, including Internazionale (Inter) during the middle of his career. In Massimo Moratti's first season as owner of Inter, he signed many Italians such as Benito Carbone, Salvatore Fresi, and Maurizio Ganz, along with Centofanti himself.

Despite being a defender, Centofanti chose the number 9 jersey, when in 1995, the league introduced the selection of personal numbers. During Centofanti's tour of duty with Inter, he debuted in his first UEFA Cup game.

Centofanti also explored the midfield position as he saw his knack for goal scoring increase. When playing for Inter, he saw his role in the defence decrease as Alessandro Pistone began to overthrow him for the left-back position. Manager Roy Hodgson also preferred Brazilian Roberto Carlos over Centofanti.

In 2004  he concluded his career and became the director of Ancona Calcio.

In 2009  he returned to football, as director of San Marino Calcio.

Television
In 2005, he left the football world for the television, when he was invited to join the hit Italian show Striscia la notizia.

Centofanti gained fame for his antics on the television screen, rather than his work on the pitch. He appears on the popular Italian television show Striscia la Notizia, where he makes skits and jokes with football players. Some of his targets include football stars Luca Toni, Francesco Totti, Clarence Seedorf, Alessandro Del Piero, and many more. Usually, in the skit, the player has a life or football related problem, and Centofanti magically appears to help them out.

Honours

Awards
 Serie C2 Champion: 2
Teramo: 1985-1986 (Serie C2/C)
Padova: 2000-2001 (Serie C2/A)

Notable Results
 1 Coppa Italia final with Ancona: 1993-1994

References

External links
 
 Official website 

1969 births
Living people
People from Teramo
Association football fullbacks
Italian footballers
Italian television personalities
S.S. Teramo Calcio players
Genoa C.F.C. players
Inter Milan players
Calcio Padova players
A.C. Ancona players
Ravenna F.C. players
Palermo F.C. players
Bassano Virtus 55 S.T. players
A.S.D. Barletta 1922 players
Serie A players
Serie B players
Serie C players
Serie D players
Footballers from Abruzzo
Sportspeople from the Province of Teramo